Drymonema larsoni (also known as the "pink meanie") is a species of jellyfish belonging to the class Scyphozoa. Following a mass sighting in 2000 in the Gulf of Mexico, the species and the rest of its genus were put in their own family, a new subset of the true jellyfish. Drymonema larsoni prey heavily upon jellyfish species belonging to the genus Aurelia, and they play an important role in controlling the population of these species.

References

Drymonematidae
Animals described in 2010